Macau is the only geographical constituency in the elections for the Legislative Assembly of Macau, with three sub-geographical constituencies under it.

Overview 
The constituency was set up in 1976 election when the highest averages method of the closed party-list proportional representation electoral system was introduced. No change of boundary had been made throughout since 1976.

The constituency covers all the parishes and zone in Macau. Members have been elected under proportional representation with seats apportioned under the highest averages method using the D'Hondt method. Suffrage was opened to Macau Residents without Portuguese citizenship in 1984.

Background 
The constituency was formed since the 1976 legislative election. Seats for the constituency have gradually increased.

Return Members
Below are all the members since the creation of the Macau constituency.

References 

 
Legislative Assembly of Macau
Constituencies established in 1976